Grantham Museum is located at St Peter's Hill, Grantham, Lincolnshire, England, in the building provided for it in 1926.

The building also housed the public library, and was partly funded by the Carnegie UK Trust which was continuing Andrew Carnegie's project of building libraries across the United Kingdom.  Grantham's library is now in the Isaac Newton Centre, and the museum occupies the whole of the 1926 building.

The idea of a museum can be traced back to meetings of the Grantham Scientific society in the 1890s.
The basis of the collection is material provided by Henry Preston, the first Curator and Founder, and twentieth century additions included material about Sir Isaac Newton, Edith Smith, and Margaret Thatcher.  There is also material about the Dambusters Raid.  The Museum hosts a variety of exhibitions during the year.

The museum is currently managed by the Grantham Community Heritage Association (GCHA).  This charity was formed in 2011 to take over the management of the museum from Lincolnshire County Council with a view to reopening the facility for the Queen's Jubilee in June 2012.

In 2013, a few months before the death of Margaret Thatcher, the GCHA announced plans to raise funds to obtain a statue of the former prime minister.

References

External links

 Local tourism information about the museum
 Grantham museum official website

Grantham
Former library buildings in England
Buildings and structures in Grantham
Local museums in Lincolnshire
Education in Grantham